Systems biology relies heavily on building mathematical models to help understand and make predictions of biological processes. Specialized software to assist in building models has been developed since the arrival of the first digital computers. The following list gives the currently supported software applications available to researchers.

The vast majority of modern systems biology modeling software support SBML, which is the de facto standard for exchanging models of biological cellular processes. Some tools also support CellML, a standard used for representing physiological processes. The advantage of using standard formats is that even though a particular software application may eventually become unsupported and even unusable, the models developed by that application can be easily transferred to more modern equivalents. This allows scientific research to be reproducible long after the original publication of the work.

To obtain more information about a particular tool, click on the name of the tool. This will direct you either to a peer-reviewed publication or, in some rare cases, to a dedicated Wikipedia page.

Actively supported open-source software applications

General information

Feature Tables

Supported modeling paradigms

Differential equation specific features

File format support and interface type

Advanced features (where applicable)

Other features

Particle-based simulators 

Particle based simulators treat each molecule of interest as an individual particle in continuous space, simulating molecular diffusion, molecule-membrane interactions and chemical reactions.

Comparison of particle-based simulators 

The following list compares the features for several particle-based simulators. This table is edited from a version that was originally published in the Encyclopedia of Computational Neuroscience. System boundaries codes: R = reflecting, A = absorbing, T = transmitting, P = periodic, and I = interacting. * Algorithm is exact but software produced incorrect results at the time of original table compilation. † These benchmark run times are not comparable with others due to differing levels of detail.

Legacy open-source software applications

The following list some very early software for modeling biochemical systems that were developed pre-1980s There are listed for historical interest.

The following list shows some of the software modeling applications that were developed in the 1980s and 1990s. There are listed for historical interest.

References 

Systems biology

Bioinformatics
Science software
Systems